Red Army Days is a 1935 Soviet comedy film directed by Alexander Zarkhi and Iosif Kheifits.

Plot 
In the provincial town for exercises come tank units of the Red Army. Tank commander Mikhail Belokon (Simon) rents a room at the agricultural school student Tonya Zhukova (Okunevskaya). Between the young people there a romantic attachment. However, each of them believes that the nascent feelings can interfere with more important, in their view, the case in life: to Tonya  - tuition at the college for Mikhail - the preparation of military vehicles and soldiers for upcoming maneuvers. Nevertheless, the characters pass by a strip of misunderstanding and explain each other in love.

Cast
 Nikolai Simonov as Tank Commander Mikhail Trofimovich Belokon
 Tatiana Okunevskaya as Tonya Zhukova (as T. Okunyovskaya)
 Yanina Zheymo as Kika, her friend (as Ya. Zheimo)
 Nikolay Cherkasov as Kolka Loshak
 Aleksandr Melnikov as Tank Driver Melnikov
 Matvey Pavlikov as Tank Driver Pavlikov (as N. Pavlikov)
 Aleksey Gribov as Tank Corps Commander Gorbunov (as A. Gribov)
 Vladimir Sladkopevtsev as Terentii Zhukov

Film crew
 Written by: Alexander Zarkhi, Iosif Kheifits
 Directed by:
 Alexander Zarkhi
 Iosif Kheifets
 Sorezhisser: Michael Shapiro
 Producer: Michael Kaplan
 Artist: Anatoly Bosulaev
 Composer: Valery Zhelobinsky
 Sound: Arnold Shargorodskii

References

External links

1935 films
1935 romantic comedy films
Soviet romantic comedy films
Russian romantic comedy films
Articles containing video clips
Soviet black-and-white films
Russian black-and-white films